Skarpnäck is a borough (stadsdelsområde) in the southern part of Stockholm, Sweden.

Overview
This area corresponds mostly with the Skarpnäck parish. The districts that make up the borough are Bagarmossen, Björkhagen, Enskededalen, Flaten, Hammarbyhöjden (except the Blåsut subdistrict), Kärrtorp, Orhem, Skarpnäcks Gård, and Skrubba.

Sports
The following sports clubs are located in Skarpnäck:

 Bagarmossen Kärrtorp BK 
 Spårvägens GoIF
 Spårvägens FF

References

External links

Boroughs of Stockholm